The sensory trigeminal nerve nuclei are the largest of the cranial nerve nuclei, and extend through the whole of the midbrain, pons and medulla, and into the high cervical spinal cord.

The nucleus is divided into three parts, from rostral to caudal (top to bottom in humans):

 The mesencephalic nucleus
 The chief sensory nucleus (or "pontine nucleus" or "main sensory nucleus" or "primary nucleus" or "principal nucleus")
 The spinal trigeminal nucleus

The spinal trigeminal nucleus is further subdivided into three parts, from rostral to caudal:
 Pars Oralis (from the Pons to the Hypoglossal nucleus)
 Pars Interpolaris (from the Hypoglossal nucleus to the obex)
 Pars Caudalis (from the obex to C2)

There is also a distinct trigeminal motor nucleus that is medial to the chief sensory nucleus.

See also
 Photic sneeze reflex
 Trigeminal nerve

Additional images

External links
 
 Washington University

Cranial nerve nuclei
Trigeminal nerve